Platyptilia nemoralis is a moth of the family Pterophoridae. It is found from Europe, through Russia to Japan.

The wingspan is 26–30 mm. Adults are on wing from early July to late August in western Europe. There is one generation per year.

The larvae feed on Senecio fuchsii, Senecio fluviatilis, Senecio sarracenicus and Senecio nemorensis. They feed in the shoots of their host plant. Pupation takes place in the feeding chambers.

External links
Taxonomic and Biological Studies of Pterophoridae of Japan (Lepidoptera)
Japanese Moths
Lepidoptera of Belgium 
Fauna Europaea

nemoralis
Moths of Japan
Moths of Europe
Moths described in 1841